Ralph English Bishop (October 1, 1915 – October 1, 1974) was an American basketball player who competed in the 1936 Summer Olympics.

He was part of the American basketball team that won the gold medal. He played three matches including the final.

Bishop later played professionally for the Denver Nuggets of the National Basketball League, a forerunner to the National Basketball Association.  He averaged 1.8 points per game during the 1948–1949 season.

He played college basketball at the University of Washington in Seattle, Washington.

Notes

External links
NBL stats
Olympic profile
USA Basketball All-Time Roster.

1915 births
1974 deaths
All-American college men's basketball players
Amateur Athletic Union men's basketball players
American men's basketball players
Basketball players at the 1936 Summer Olympics
Basketball players from New York City
Basketball players from Washington (state)
Chicago Stags draft picks
Denver Nuggets (1948–1950) players
Junior college men's basketball players in the United States
Olympic gold medalists for the United States in basketball
Sportspeople from Brooklyn
United States men's national basketball team players
Washington Huskies men's basketball players
Medalists at the 1936 Summer Olympics
Forwards (basketball)